Xyletinini is a tribe of death-watch and spider beetles in the family Ptinidae. There are at least 10 genera and 70 described species in Xyletinini.

Genera
These 10 genera belong to the tribe Xyletinini:
 Euvrilletta Fall, 1905 i c g b
 Neoxyletinus Español, 1983
 Paraxyletinus Espaol, 1972 g
 Pseudoptilinus Leiler, 1963 g
 Trachelobrachys Gemminger, 1870 g
 Vrilletta LeConte, 1874 i c g b
 Xyletinodes Español, 1983
 Xyletinomorphus Pic, 1923
 Xyletinus Latreille, 1809 i c g b
 Xyletomerus Fall, 1905 i c g b
Data sources: i = ITIS, c = Catalogue of Life, g = GBIF, b = Bugguide.net

References

Further reading

 
 
 
 
 
 
 
 
 
 

Ptinidae